There are two stately homes in England called Stanford Hall.  

Stanford Hall, Leicestershire, near Lutterworth
Stanford Hall, Nottinghamshire (Defence and National Rehabilitation Centre), near Loughborough

United States 
Stanford Hall, a dormitory at the University of Notre Dame, South Bend, Indiana